NA-25 (Dera Ismail Khan-cum-Tank) was a constituency for the National Assembly of Pakistan. It was split into NA-37 (Tank) and NA-39 (Dera Ismail Khan-II) in 2018. The constituency was established as NA-25 (Dera Ismail Khan) in 1977 when Tank was part of Dera Ismail Khan District as one of its tehsils. In 1992, with Tank becoming a district itself, the constituency name was changed to NA-25 (Dera Ismail Khan-cum-Tank).

Members of Parliament

1977–2002: NA-25 (D.I.Khan)

1993–2002: NA-25 (D.I.Khan-cum-Tank)

2002–2018: NA-25 (D.I.Khan-cum-Tank)

Elections since 2002

2002 general election

A total of 3,622 votes were rejected.

2008 general election

A total of 4,613 votes were rejected.

2013 general election

A total of 9,165 votes were rejected.

2013 By-election

A by-election took place on 22 August 2013.

References

External links 
Election result's official website

Dera Ismail Khan|Tank